Robert Semple may refer to:

 Robert Sample (died 1719), or Semple, pirate who left Edward England to sail the Caribbean
 Robert Semple (Canada) (1777–1816), governor of the Red River Colony in Canada
 Robert Semple (Medal of Honor) (1887–1943), Medal of Honor recipient
 Robert B. Semple (1806–1854), California newspaperman & politician, who helped found Benicia, California
 Robert B. Semple Jr. (born 1936), 1996 Pulitzer Prize winner
 Bob Semple (1873–1955), New Zealand politician
 Robert James Semple, Irish missionary, first husband of Aimee Semple McPherson